The 800 metres at the 2006 Commonwealth Games as part of the athletics programme were held at the Melbourne Cricket Ground on Wednesday 22 March 2006 and Thursday 23 March 2006.

The top two runners in each of the three heats automatically qualified for the final. The next two fastest runners from across the heats also qualified. Those 8 runners competed in the final.

Records

Medals

Qualification

Going into the event, the top ten Commonwealth athletes as ranked by the International Association of Athletics Federations were:

Alex Kipchirchir's gold in this event took him from outside the top 100 to 24th in the world, and to seventh in the Commonwealth.

Results
All times shown are in minutes.
 Q denotes qualification by place in heat.
 q denotes qualification by overall place.
 DNS denotes did not start.
 DNF denotes did not finish.
 DQ denotes disqualification.
 NR denotes national record.
 GR denotes Games record.
 WR denotes world record.
 PB denotes personal best.
 SB denotes season best.

Heats

Final

References
Results

800 metres
2006